Kaptallah, also known as Kaptanle is a historic Somali clan. The clan established the port city of Bandar Qassim (today Bosaso) in the early 9th century, and traded with Persia, India and the Arabian peninsula. The clan belongs to the Harti confederation of the Darod clan. The clan inhabits the areas south and south-east of Bosaso along with the Ali Jibrail and Dashishe clans.

See also

 List of trading companies
 Maritime history of Somalia

References

19th century in Somalia
Trading companies
Maritime history of Somalia